The following is a list of research labs and centers located at the University of Massachusetts Amherst:
 Antennas and Propagation Laboratory (Electrical and Computer Engineering)
 Apiary Laboratory (Entomology, Microbiology)
 Architecture and Real Time Laboratory (Electrical and Computer Systems Engineering)
 Autonomous Learning Laboratory (Computer Science)
 Center for Advanced Sensor and Communication Antennas (CASCA) (Electrical and Computer Engineering)
 Center for Applied Mathematics and Mathematical Computation (Mathematics)
 Center for Economic Development
 Center for Education Policy
 Center for Energy Efficiency and Renewable Energy (Mechanical and Industrial Engineering)
 Center for Geometry, Analysis, Numerics, and Graphics (Mathematics)
 Center for Intelligent Information Retrieval (Computer Science)
 Center for Public Policy and Administration
 Center for e-design
 Complex Systems Modeling and Control Laboratory (Electrical and Computer Systems Engineering)
 Emerging Electronics Laboratory (Electrical and Computer Systems Engineering)
 Engineering Research Center for Collaborative Adaptive Sensing of the Atmosphere (Electrical and Computer Systems Engineering)
 Feedback Control Systems Lab (Electrical and Computer Systems Engineering)
 Information Systems Laboratory (Electrical and Computer Systems Engineering)
 Knowledge Discovery Laboratory (Computer Science)
 Labor Relations and Research Center
 Laboratory For Perceptual Robotics (Computer Science)
 Laboratory for Millimeter Wavelength Devices and Applications (Electrical and Computer Systems Engineering)
 Massachusetts Center for Renewable Energy Science and Technology
 Microwave Remote Sensing Laboratory (MIRSL)(Electrical and Computer Systems Engineering)
 Multimedia Networks Laboratory (Electrical and Computer Systems Engineering)
 Multimedia Networks and Internet Laboratory (Electrical and Computer Systems Engineering)
 Nanoscale Computing Fabrics Lab (Electrical and Computer Systems Engineering)
 National Center for Digital Governance
 Network Systems Laboratory (Electrical and Computer Systems Engineering)
 Political Economy Research Institute
 Reconfigurable Computing Laboratory (Electrical and Computer Systems Engineering)
 Scientific Reasoning Research Institute
 Soil Mechanics Laboratories (located at Marston Hall and ELAB-II)
 Terahertz Laboratory (Electrical and Computer Systems Engineering)
 The Environmental Institute
 VLSI CAD Laboratory (Electrical and Computer Systems Engineering)
 VLSI Circuits and Systems Laboratory (Electrical and Computer Systems Engineering)
 Virtual Center for Supernetworks
 Wind Energy Center (formerly the Renewable Energy Research Laboratory) (Mechanical and Industrial Engineering)
 Wireless Systems Laboratory (Electrical and Computer Systems Engineering)
 Yield and Reliability of VLSI Circuits (Electrical and Computer Systems Engineering)

University of Massachusetts Amherst